The 12th Lambda Literary Awards were held in 2000 to honour works of LGBT literature published in 1999.

Nominees and winners

External links
 12th Lambda Literary Awards

Lambda Literary Awards
Lambda
Lists of LGBT-related award winners and nominees
2000 in LGBT history
2000 awards in the United States